Frédéric Mazzella (born March 9, 1976) is a French entrepreneur and the founder of BlaBlaCar, an online marketplace for carpools.

Early life and education
Mazzella was classically trained as a pianist and was educated at some of the best schools in France. After majoring in maths, physics and chemistry at the Lycée Henri IV, he received a Master of Physics at the École Normale Supérieure (Normal Sup). While a student at Normal Sup, he received an internship in the robotics department of Stanford University, designing a virtual tool to allow surgeons on NASA spaceflights practice procedures before performing them on astronauts. In 1999, he enrolled at Stanford in a master's program in computer science.

Career
After receiving a degree, he returned to Paris and began working for Kabira. At Kabira Frédéric quickly demonstrated a high level of ability to perform in any role assigned, quickly moving from Support to Project Management and Pre-Sales, even composing the music for the on-hold tone on the in house phone system. It was obvious that he was quickly outgrowing the organisation. In 1999, he also worked as a consultant for Blue Pumpkin and in 2000, he worked as a research assistant for Nippon Telegraph and Telephone in Japan.

In September 2015, Mazzella was ranked 49th on the WIRED list of top 100 digital influencers.

BlaBlaCar
In December 2003, Mazzella wanted to travel from Paris to visit his family in the French countryside for Christmas but he did not own a car and the trains were fully booked. After his sister made a 150-kilometer detour to collect him, he noticed that most cars going in his direction did not have any passengers. During nights and weekends, he began working on creating a concept to address the issue. By 2006, he bought a website called Covoiturage.fr, French for "carpooling", probably inspired from what is running in one big neighbour country for years.

In 2007, Mazzella enrolled at the Master of Business Administration program at INSEAD.

In 2008, along with Francis Nappez and Nicolas Brusson, he launched BlaBlaCar. In 2015, BlaBlaCar raised $200m bringing total funding to over $300m and valuing the company at $1.6bn.

References

1976 births
École Normale Supérieure alumni
French business executives
French businesspeople
INSEAD alumni
Living people
Lycée Henri-IV alumni
Stanford University alumni
Technology company founders